New York City's 13th City Council district is one of 51 districts in the New York City Council. It is currently represented by Democrat Marjorie Velázquez, who took office in 2022.

Geography
District 13 covers a series of smaller neighborhoods in the East Bronx, including Throggs Neck, Pelham Parkway, Morris Park, Pelham Bay, Pelham Gardens, Schuylerville, Country Club, Locust Point, and Westchester Square, as well as parts of Allerton and Van Nest.

City Island, a small populated island to the east of the borough's mainland, is a part of the district. Pelham Bay Park, the city's largest park, is also located within the district, as are Ferry Point Park and Hart Island.

The district overlaps with Bronx Community Boards 9, 10, and 11, and is contained almost entirely within New York's 14th congressional district, with a small extension into the 16th district. It also overlaps with the 32nd, 33rd, 34th, and 36th districts of the New York State Senate, and with the 80th, 82nd, and 87th districts of the New York State Assembly.

Recent election results

2021
In 2019, voters in New York City approved Ballot Question 1, which implemented ranked-choice voting in all local elections. Under the new system, voters have the option to rank up to five candidates for every local office. Voters whose first-choice candidates fare poorly will have their votes redistributed to other candidates in their ranking until one candidate surpasses the 50 percent threshold. If one candidate surpasses 50 percent in first-choice votes, then ranked-choice tabulations will not occur.

2017

v

2013

2009

References

New York City Council districts